Canady may refer to:

 Alexa Canady, a medical doctor.
 Charles T. Canady, the Chief Justice of the Supreme Court of Florida.
 Kevin Canady, an American professional wrestler.
 Moden Canady, a First Order captain in Star Wars: The Last Jedi
 Stephen D. Canady (1865–1923), American politician and businessman

See also 
 Canady, Missouri, a ghost town, United States
 Canada (disambiguation)